Wir Deutschen - Eine Reise zu den Schauplätzen der Vergangenheit (We Germans - a journey to the scenes of the past) is a 13-part documentary series first shown on German television in 1991 and 1992. The series presents a condensed history of the Germans from 300 BC to the abdication of the last Kaiser in 1918.

The series was written and directed by Bernhard Dircks and narrated (except for the final episode) by Gert Westphal. Pieces by Edvard Grieg are used as backing music.

Episodes

See also
List of German television series

External links
 

1991 German television series debuts
1992 German television series endings
German documentary television series
German-language television shows
Das Erste original programming